Chowk may refer to:

Website
Chowk.com, a website about current affairs, politics and cultural aspects of India and Pakistan

Localities

In Bangladesh
Chowk Bazaar, a bazaar in Lalbagh

In India
Chowk, Allahabad, a locality/township of Allahabad, Uttar Pradesh
Ashram Chowk, an intersection in Delhi
Chandni Chowk, a market in Delhi
Chandni Chowk metro station, Delhi
Chandni Chowk Flyover, a bridge
Chandni Chowk (Lok Sabha constituency)
Chandni Chowk metro station, Kolkata
Chawk Masjid, a mosque in Murshidabad
Dharna Chowk, Hyderabad, an area in Hyderabad
Hutatma Chowk, a square in South Mumbai
IFFCO Chowk metro station, a metro station in Delhi
Jawahar Chowk, an area in Ahmedabad
Kali Charan Inter College, a college in Lucknow
Kargil Chowk, a war memorial in Patna
Lal Chowk, a square in Srinagar
Neighbourhoods of Ranchi#Lalpur, an intersection in Ranchi
Manek Chowk (Ahmedabad), a square and market in Ahmedabad
Nana Chowk, a neighborhood in Mumbai
Patel Chowk metro station in Delhi
Connaught Place, New Delhi
Rajiv Chowk metro station
Utsav Chowk, a landmark in Navi Mumbai

In Pakistan
Baghbanpura Chowk, a square in Gujranwala
Bismillah Chowk, a neighborhood in Karachi
Chowk Azam, a city in Layyah District
Chowk Shaheedan, a square in Mirpur
Chowk Yadgar a square in Peshawar
Ghanta Ghar Chowk, Clock Tower Town Square in Multan
Green Square, an intersection in Mingora
Kalma Chowk, a town square and intersection in Lahore
Kalma Chowk Flyover, a bridge
Khatm-e-Nabuwat Chowk, a square and landmark in Chiniot
Makan Bagh, an intersection in Mingora
Perfume Chowk, a location in Karachi

See also
Chowrangi, an Urdu word meaning crossroads
Chaunk, a cooking technique and garnish used in the cuisines of India, Bangladesh, and Pakistan